The B-2 was a conversion of Salmson Z9 water-cooled aircraft engines to air cooling by Albert Menasco in the United States.

Applications
 Timm Aircoach

Specifications (B-2)

See also

References

B-2
Aircraft engines
Air-cooled aircraft piston engines